Yakup Çelebi may refer to:

 Yakup II of Germiyan
 Yakub Çelebi